The term principal case refers to a legal case that is deemed basic to understanding a legal principle. As a result, it may also refer to the case in a casebook that introduces a discussion of that principle.

Legal terminology